Aaron Stecker (born November 13, 1975) is a former American football running back. He was signed by the Chicago Bears as an undrafted free agent in 1999. He played college football at Western Illinois and Wisconsin.

Stecker also played for the Tampa Bay Buccaneers, New Orleans Saints, and Atlanta Falcons. He earned a Super Bowl ring with the Buccaneers in Super Bowl XXXVII.

Mainly used as a backup for most of his career, Stecker started 14 games during his five years with the Saints, and also often served as a kick returner for both Tampa Bay and New Orleans.

On April 20, 2010, Stecker announced that he was retiring from football, although later in 2010, he worked out for, but did not sign with, the Green Bay Packers.

Early years
Stecker attended Ashwaubenon High School in Ashwaubenon, Wisconsin, and was a letterman in football and baseball. He led the Ashwaubenon football team to the state championship in 1993. His number, 27, has been retired.

College career
Stecker began his college career at Wisconsin in 1995.  He spent two years with the University of Wisconsin, recording three 100-yard games, a 100-yard kick return for a touchdown, and a 63-yard punt return for a touchdown.  In 1997, he transferred to Western Illinois after the emergence of future Heisman Trophy winner Ron Dayne pushed Stecker from his starting role with the Badgers.  During the 1997 season, Stecker recorded 2,293 rushing yards en route to winning the Gateway Football Conference player of the year award.  Stecker finished his career at Western Illinois as the school's all-time leading rusher, with 3,799 yards in just two seasons.  This record was broken by Travis Glasford in 2005, and is now held by Herb Donaldson, as of 2008.

Professional career

Chicago Bears 
Stecker spent the 1999 training camp with the Chicago Bears; however, he did not make the active roster.

Scottish Claymores 
Before the 2000 season, the Tampa Bay Buccaneers allocated Stecker to the Scottish Claymores of NFL Europe.  Stecker led the league in total scrimmage yards through the first two weeks in the season. He wound up garnering Offensive MVP honors.

Tampa Bay Buccaneers 
Early in his career in Tampa Bay, Stecker credits Fred McAfee for bolstering his confidence. During the 2000 season, Stecker began returning kickoffs for the Bucs. During his four years with the team, he became a core special teams player, along with sporadic duty as a pass-catching back. He also won Super Bowl XXXVII  with the team before leaving after 2003.

New Orleans Saints 
Signing with the New Orleans Saints before 2004, Stecker became a return man and scat back. Competing with established backs such as Reggie Bush and Deuce McAllister led to sparse playing time. He was placed on injured reserve during the 2008 season and did not return to the team the following year.

Atlanta Falcons 
Stecker was signed by the Atlanta Falcons in the middle the 2009 season, where he played mostly on special teams. He carried the ball five times and caught it five times as well. The Packers also showed interest in Stecker in 2009.

Retirement 
In April 2010, Stecker retired. He was tried out by the Green Bay Packers later that year but did not garner a contract offer.

NFL career statistics

Regular season

Postseason

Personal life
Stecker's wife Kara is the daughter of Diane Hendricks and the late Ken Hendricks, founder of ABC Supply.  They have two children, daughter, Skylar Stecker, and son, Dorsett. Skylar is a singer: by age 12 she had sung the national anthem at Wisconsin Badgers, New Orleans Saints, UCLA, and Green Bay Packers games.

References

1975 births
Living people
Sportspeople from Green Bay, Wisconsin
Players of American football from Wisconsin
American football running backs
Wisconsin Badgers football players
Western Illinois Leathernecks football players
Chicago Bears players
Tampa Bay Buccaneers players
Scottish Claymores players
New Orleans Saints players
Atlanta Falcons players
People from Ashwaubenon, Wisconsin